Elena Yurievna Bechke (born 7 January 1966) is a Russian former pair skater. She competed for the Soviet Union, the Commonwealth of Independent States, and the Unified Team. With her then-husband Denis Petrov, she is the 1992 Olympic silver medalist, the 1989 World bronze medalist, and the 1991 and 1992 European silver medalist.

Career 
As a young skater, Bechke was told by her coaches that she had no talent and that she should quit skating. She did not give up and skated with Valery Kornienko from 1979 to 1987. Their notable competitions included a gold medal at the inaugural pairs event of the 1984 Skate Canada International, as well as  the 1986 European Championships, where they won the bronze.

Bechke began skating with Denis Petrov, two years her junior, in 1987. They trained with Tamara Moskvina at the Yubileyny Sports Palace in Saint Petersburg. They won their first international title at the 1988 Grand Prix International de Paris, although they missed the 1988 Olympic team as they finished fourth at the Soviet Figure Skating Championships. Their first appearance at the Worlds was at the 1989 World Championships. Again, Bechke and Petrov had finished fourth and initially did not qualify for the Soviet Worlds team, but they won a skate-off to replace an injured team. They captured the bronze medal at their first Worlds showing, but they again placed fourth at the Soviet Nationals in 1990, missing the World Championships. In 1991, they placed third at the Nationals and fourth at the Worlds. In 1992, they won the Soviet Nationals over the teams of Evgenia Shishkova and Vadim Naumov and Marina Eltsova and Andrei Bushkov (Bechke and Petrov's training partners and chief rivals, Natalia Mishkutenok and Artur Dmitriev, missed the Nationals but qualified for the Olympics as they were the reigning World Champions). Bechke and Petrov also won silver medals at the 1991 and 1992 European Championships, and the silver medal at the 1992 Olympic Games behind Mishkutenok and Dmitriev. Their choreographer was Alexander Matveev. They retired from amateur competition after the 1992 Worlds.

Bechke and Petrov's moderate success as amateurs stemmed from Bechke's inconsistency in competition due to her nerves, as well as many uninspiring (and some downright questionable) competitive programs, such as the infamous "Dialogue of Cats," created by their coach that did little to showcase their talents. After turning professional in 1992, the pair steadily improved as competitors and performers, and were regarded by many as one of the best professional pairs teams of their time. They won every single competition they entered in 1996, including the World Professional Championships. They placed second at their last World Professional Championships, in 1999.

They toured with Stars on Ice for seven years (1994–2000). They resided and trained as professionals in Lake Placid, New York, before relocating to Richmond, Virginia, in 1997 to train and coach there. Bechke retired from skating after the 1999–2000 season, while Petrov continued to skate with Stars on Ice for another two seasons.

As both amateurs and professionals, Bechke and Petrov were known for their exquisite posture and lines, inventive moves (such as the "Impossible" death spiral), great unison and proximity on their jumps and side-by-side spins, as well as many difficult and intricate lift sequences.

Personal life 
Bechke is of Hungarian descent on her father's side (the Hungarian spelling of her last name being Becske). Her Hungarian heritage is reflected in two professional programs with Petrov: Joue Jusqu'au Matin (1997–1998) to a medley of songs by Hungarian Gypsy composer Yoska Nemeth, and Czardas by Leahy (1999–2000).

Bechke and Petrov began dating in 1988, were married in 1990, but divorced in 1995. In Steve Milton's book, Skate Talk, Bechke has said that while the marriage was not one of "convenience" (as was many times the case in the USSR), she did feel pressured by her parents to get married as she was getting "so old". Bechke and Petrov remained best friends and both said that their skating and friendship improved after the divorce. They even continued vacationing together after ending their off-ice relationship.

Bechke married Wayne Ellis in 2001. They have a son, Alex, born in 2002, and a daughter, Sophia, born in 2004. As of 2009, she is a coach in North Carolina.

Programs 
(with Petrov)

Competitive highlights

With Petrov

With Kornienko

References

External links 

Change Partners But Keep Skating Anyway

1966 births
Living people
Russian female pair skaters
Soviet female pair skaters
Figure skaters at the 1992 Winter Olympics
Olympic figure skaters of the Unified Team
Olympic silver medalists for the Unified Team
Figure skaters from Saint Petersburg
Olympic medalists in figure skating
Russian people of Hungarian descent
World Figure Skating Championships medalists
European Figure Skating Championships medalists
Medalists at the 1992 Winter Olympics
Universiade medalists in figure skating
Goodwill Games medalists in figure skating
Universiade silver medalists for the Soviet Union
Competitors at the 1987 Winter Universiade
Competitors at the 1990 Goodwill Games